Karolina Szczepaniak (born 12 August 1992 in Warsaw) is a Polish swimmer who competes in the Women's 400 m individual medley. At the 2012 Summer Olympics she finished 31st overall in the heats in the Women's 400 metre individual medley and failed to reach the final.

References

Polish female medley swimmers
1992 births
Living people
Olympic swimmers of Poland
Swimmers at the 2008 Summer Olympics
Swimmers at the 2012 Summer Olympics
Swimmers from Warsaw